The 2020–21 San Jose Sharks season was the 30th season for the National Hockey League franchise that was established on May 9, 1990.

On December 20, 2020, the league temporarily realigned into four divisions with no conferences due to the COVID-19 pandemic and the ongoing closure of the Canada–United States border. As a result of this realignment, the Sharks will play this season in the West Division and will play games against only the other teams in their new division during the regular season and potentially the first two rounds of the playoffs.

Due to Santa Clara County banning all contact sports in response to a local rise of COVID-19 cases, the Sharks began the season on an extended road trip. Their first two home games on February 1 and 3 against the Vegas Golden Knights were to have been held at Gila River Arena, the home of division rival Arizona Coyotes, but ended up being postponed due to a COVID outbreak among the Golden Knights. On January 25, Santa Clara County health officials announced that they were lifting the ban, and the Sharks returned to SAP Center on February 13.

On May 3, the Sharks were eliminated from playoff contention after a 5–4 overtime loss to the Colorado Avalanche.

Draft picks

Below are the San Jose Sharks' selections at the 2020 NHL Entry Draft, which was originally scheduled for June 26 and 27, 2020, at the Bell Center in Montreal, Quebec, but was postponed on March 25, 2020, to October 6 and 7, 2020. It was instead held virtually via video conference call from the NHL Network studio in Secaucus, New Jersey.

Notes:
 The Buffalo Sabres traded their 38th and 100th selection in this years' draft for the 34th pick from the Sharks.
 The Sharks traded their 100th and 126th selection in this years' draft for the 76th pick to the Edmonton Oilers.

Standings

Divisional standings

Schedule and results

Regular season
The schedule was announced on December 23, 2020.

Player statistics

Skaters

Goaltenders

†Denotes player spent time with another team before joining the Sharks. Stats reflect time with the Sharks only.
‡Denotes player was traded mid-season. Stats reflect time with the Sharks only.

Transactions
The Sharks have been involved in the following transactions during the 2020–21 season.

Trades

Free agents

Waivers

Signings

Contract terminations

Awards

Notes

References

San Jose Sharks seasons
Sharks
San Jose Sharks
San Jose Sharks